Gang Yoon-goo (born February 8, 1993) is a South Korean football player who has played in the J2 League and currently plays for Daegu FC in the K League 1.

Playing career
Gang Yoon-goo played for J2 League club; Vissel Kobe, Oita Trinita and Ehime FC from 2013 to 2015.

References

External links

1993 births
Living people
South Korean footballers
J2 League players
Vissel Kobe players
Oita Trinita players
Ehime FC players
Daegu FC players
Korea National League players
K3 League players
K League 1 players
Association football defenders